Kitayama Eiga Seisakujo (Kitayama Movie Factory) was the first true animation studio in Japan.  It was founded by Seitaro Kitayama in 1921.

Animations
Kiatsu to Mizuage Ponpu (Atmospheric pressure and suction pumps) (1921) 
Shokubutsu Seiri: Seishoku no Maki (Plant Physiology: Story of Reproduction) (1922)
Usagi to Kame (Rabbit and Tortoise) (1924)

References

1921 establishments in Japan
Mass media companies established in 1921
Japanese animation studios